Roaring Frontiers is a 1941 American Western film directed by Lambert Hillyer and starring Tex Ritter, Wild Bill Elliott and Ruth Ford.

Plot

Cast
 Wild Bill Elliott as Wild Bill Hickok
 Tex Ritter as Tex Martin 
 Ruth Ford as Reba Bailey
 Frank Mitchell as Cannonball
 Bradley Page as Hawk Hammond
 Tristram Coffin as Bert
 Hal Taliaferro as Link Twiddle
 Francis Walker as Boot Hill - Henchman
 Joe McGuinn as Knuckles - Henchman
 George Chesebro as Red - Bartender
 Charles Stevens as Moccasin
 Hank Bell as Hank - Stage driver
 Lew Meehan as Henchman

References

Bibliography
 Bond, Johnny. The Tex Ritter Story. Chappell Music Company, 1976.
Parish, James Robert & Pitts, Michael R. Film directors: a guide to their American films. Scarecrow Press, 1974.

External links
 

1941 films
1941 Western (genre) films
American Western (genre) films
Films directed by Lambert Hillyer
Columbia Pictures films
1940s English-language films
1940s American films